Maria Cristina National High School (abbreviated as MCNHS) is a high school in Iligan, Philippines founded on 1972.

History
The School was formerly known as Maria Cristina Barangay High School and its opening of said barangay high school was based on the provision of Republic Act 6050, otherwise known as the Barrio High School. In this event, the request to open a barangay high school in Barangay Maria Cristina was initiated by the Barangay Captain with a joint petition of the residents of said barangay.

With its approval, the Maria Cristina Barangay High School was established in June of 1972, with 183 students and five teachers. There were two sections in the first year and one section in the second year as a start. There were classes held at the barangay hall and two classes at the elementary school. The school grew in population causing the PTA to construct a temporary classroom made of nipa to accommodate enrollees in the following school year.

Due to the growing population, additional teachers were hired. What started with three sections with five teachers become 17 sections with 26 teachers funded under the local school board and the majority were funded by the national government.

At present, [when?] the school has 40 sets of computers and other facilities needed by the growing population. There is a three-hectare (7.4-acre) lot owned by the National Power Corporation as the new school site of Maria Cristina National High School. A Memorandum of Agreement was signed between the National Transmission Corporation (TRANSCO) and the Local School Board of Iligan City Division to allow the usage of the unutilized portion of the lot of cadastral lot number 292, a land reserved for the project of National Power Corporation (NPC) by Proclamation Number 335 as the site of Maria Cristina National High School.

The school desires to develop a new site for the school to transfer and grow in terms of population, buildings, facilities, and school equipment. As of June 2004, the new site was being occupied by the fourth-year students first due to the existence of two buildings with only six classrooms. However, at present, all the year levels already utilized the said site.[needs update]

References

High schools in the Philippines
Educational institutions established in 1972
1972 establishments in the Philippines